Krechek or krecek or sambal goreng krechek is a traditional Javanese cattle skin spicy stew dish from Yogyakarta and Central Java, Indonesia. Traditionally it is made from the soft inner skin of cattle (cow or water buffalo), however the most common recipe today uses readily available rambak or krupuk kulit (cattle skin crackers).

The rambak cracker are cooked in coconut milk-base stew, with diced potatoes and fried soy beans. It is mixed with bumbu (spice mixture) with plenty of red chili peppers. Because the skin crackers absorb coconut milk and spices, they become moist. Krechek has a soft and moist texture with rich and spicy taste and reddish-orange color. Some recipes might add cow liver as sambal goreng hati krecek, while others might add diced tofu.

Serving
Krechek is served with white steamed rice. It is often served as side dish, part of nasi gudeg, nasi campur or nasi uduk set.

See also

 Gudeg
 Nasi uduk

References

External links 
Sambal goreng krechek recipe 

Javanese cuisine